E-file may refer to:

 Canadian efile, an electronic tax filing system of Canada Revenue Agency for professional tax preparers
 E-file, or electronic court filing, a system for automated transmission of legal documents
 e-file.lu, a website for communication between financial institutions and regulators in Luxembourg
 E-FILE, a trademark filed by Sony Corporation in 1986
 IRS e-file, an electronic tax filing system of the United States Internal Revenue Service

See also 
 Electronic tax filing (disambiguation)